The House at 54 Spring Street in Wakefield, Massachusetts is a well-preserved Queen Anne Victorian house.  The -story house was built c. 1889–90, and is most notable for its detailed shingle work.  The house has an L shape, with a porch that wraps around the front and right side, into the crook of the L.  The windows are topped by shed-roofed hoods with cut shingles, and there are bands of decorative shingle work filling the north side gables.

The house was listed on the National Register of Historic Places in 1989.

See also
National Register of Historic Places listings in Wakefield, Massachusetts
National Register of Historic Places listings in Middlesex County, Massachusetts

References

Houses in Wakefield, Massachusetts
Houses on the National Register of Historic Places in Wakefield, Massachusetts
Queen Anne architecture in Massachusetts
Houses completed in 1889